The Banking Bureau is a bureau of the Financial Supervisory Commission of Taiwan.

Organizational structures
 Legal Affairs
 Domestic Banks
 Credit Cooperatives
 Trust and Bills Finance Co.
 Foreign Banks
 Financial Holdings Co.
 IT Office
 Accounting Office
 Secretary Office
 Statistics Office
 Personnel Office
 Ethics Office

See also
 List of banks in Taiwan

References

External links
 

Executive Yuan
Finance in Taiwan
Organizations based in New Taipei
Banking in Taiwan